SS Alt was a freight vessel built for the Lancashire and Yorkshire Railway in 1911.

History

She was built by William Dobson and Company in Walker Yard, Walker, Newcastle upon Tyne, England for the Lancashire and Yorkshire Railway and launched on 25 October 1911.

In May 1916 she was in collision with the French steamer Iles Chausey. The Iles Chausey sank with six men missing.

In 1922 she transferred to the London and North Western Railway and in 1923 to the London, Midland and Scottish Railway.

On 2 June 1932, whilst in the west dock in Goole, there was a serious fire in the store room adjacent to the engine room.

In 1948 she was taken over by the British Transport Commission. She was scrapped in January 1955.

References

1911 ships
Steamships of the United Kingdom
Ships built on the River Tyne
Ships of the Lancashire and Yorkshire Railway
Ships of the London and North Western Railway
Ships of the London, Midland and Scottish Railway